The Battle of Martinique also known as Harman's Martinican Bonfire was a major naval battle fought in the Caribbean island of Martinique at St Pierre, from 30 June to 7 July 1667 that came towards the end of the Second Anglo-Dutch War. A French merchantile fleet anchored in the bay led by Joseph-Antoine Le Fèvre de la Barre was attacked by an English fleet led by Admiral Sir John Harman. The English were victorious, virtually wiping out the French merchant fleet in the Caribbean, which was unaccompanied by any naval vessels, and enabled them to secure their domination and position in the West Indies despite being at the war's end.

Background 
The Anglo Dutch war had spread to the Caribbean in 1665 and the English had been quick to capture the Dutch-held colonies of Suriname and St Eustatius. A French declaration of war on the side of the Dutch in mid April 1666 took the situation a step further and buoyed a Dutch counterattack. Quickly the French under Joseph-Antoine Le Fèvre de La Barre took over the English Caribbean islands offsetting English control. First the English half of St Kitts fell, quickly followed by Antigua and Montserrat. The Dutch meanwhile under Admiral Abraham Crijnssen had reconquered the island of Saint Eustacias and following that recaptured Suriname. With the Caribbean clearly in Franco Dutch control Abraham Crijnssen and de La Barre combined forces and agreed to a Franco-Dutch invasion of Nevis on 20 May 1667. However this invasion was repelled by the English in a confused action. After this failed attack and the fallout that followed the French merchant fleet, under de la Barre, moved to Martinique. The Dutch under Crijnssen moved to the Virginia colony to make an attack there.

In early June a new British fleet, under the command of Rear-Admiral Sir John Harman, reached the West Indies. Harman brought seven men-of-war and two fireships with him, transforming the balance of power in the area. He set sail southeast from Nevis to try and intercept de La Barre's fleet and so headed for Martinique on 25 June. Harman with his original squadron, plus Jersey and the fifth rate frigate Norwich now had a total strength of eight ships of the line, a frigate, two fireships, and two ketches. He saw nineteen French West India Company vessels and fourteen Martinican traders huddled beneath Fort Saint Pierre and protected by two smaller forts by midday of 29 June.

Harman's squadron
 Lion (58 guns) flagship
 Jersey (50)
 Crown (48)
 Newcastle (50)
 Dover (46)
 Bonaventure (48)
 Assistance (46)
 Assurance (38)
 Norwich (26) frigate
 Joseph fireship
 Prosperous fireship
 Portsmouth (10) ketch
 Roe (8) ketch

Battle

30 June 
At 4:30 pm Harman's formation attacked and stood into the bay; all ships were in action within half an hour. The combined fire of the anchored ships and batteries did some damage to Harman's ships but also the French ships and forts had suffered some damage too. After nearly an hour of desultory fire Harman withdrew with the wind in his favor. This tactic of drawing the French fire was to become part of Harman's strategy, for he knew that the French would soon run out of powder eventually. The French were blockaded so no reinforcements could get through. The English could be resupplied if they needed it.

1 July 
The next day in the afternoon Harman's flagship Lion and three Fourth Rates led the English fleet back into Saint Pierre's Bay precipitating a four-hour firefight that ended with the English vessels becoming becalmed, obliging them to be towed out of range by the end of the day. The English rowers suffered heavily but managed to succeed in getting the ships out. Damage to the French ships was moderate but Harman knew the strategy would work.

2 July 
On 2 July Harman again assaulted the main harbor, engaging in a spirited three-hour exchange with its anchored warships and batteries under Lieutenant-Général Joseph-Antoine Le Fèvre de La Barre, the Governor Robert de Clodoré, and Commodore de Loubière before the English were obliged to withdraw again. The French, suffering heavy casualties, are hoping for relief but no ship can get out because of the blockading English ships.

4 July 
On 4 July after repair damage at 10 am, Harman made his third attack into the harbor, obliging its French defenders to expend a good deal of their remaining powder during a two-hour exchange. The English withdrew again unmolested. Harman now saw that his strategy was working, so he repaired the damage and was also resupplied by powder and shot from support vessels from Barbados which in course took two days.

6 July 
This time on the 6th Harman and his fleet entered into the harbor again, and noticed French counter fire growing increasingly slack. During a lull, Harman then used a fireship, releasing it which then managed to slip through the smoke and grappled the Lis Couronée which set it ablaze. This conflagration quickly swept through to other French ships; Saint Jean, Mercier, and Lion d’Or, which were consumed down to their waterlines. As a result, French crews panicked forcing them to abandon most other ships.

A confused action now began to take shape with both sides not knowing what was happening due to poor light and heavy smoke both from the battle and burning ships. The fire ship Pucelle was set ablaze by its own French crew members, who then swam ashore. After five hours the English retired, leaving the badly shaken French resolved to scuttling their remaining vessels in the confusion and afraid that another attack would occur.

7 July 
The very next day Harman and his warships entered in the bay yet again but this time concentrating their fire on the three forts. As soon as they were close enough the English unleashed a point-blank bombardment against Fort Saint Pierre's battered redoubts. Then the next target - Fort Saint Robert - was soon reduced to rubble in the same way, but Governor Clodoré and militia Captain Guillaume d’Orange managed to resist bravely from Fort Saint Sébastien by supplementing their meager magazines from the fireship Souci. This fort, too, was eventually battered into submission and Harman seeing his victory complete retired an hour and a half later. After the battle had ended Harman though realized his luck was in and discovered that most of his ships were nearly out of ammunition.

Aftermath 
Harman retired completely from Martinique before dawn on 11 July, returning to Nevis for repairs. The English had won a major victory at the cost of eighty casualties; they had burnt at least eight of the French ships, sank several more, and captured most of the remaining ships, for only two or three French ships are recorded as having escaped. French losses were heavy; as many as 600 were killed or wounded with another 400 captured.

Samuel Pepys recorded the news of the event in his diary whilst doing business with the Lords of the Treasury:

..and here do hear by Tom Killigrew and Mr. Progers that for certain news has come of Harman having spoilt 19 of 20 French ships somewhere about the Barbados I think but wherever it is, it is good service and very welcome

Harman, with the French fleet neutralized, then attacked the French at Cayenne forcing its garrison to surrender and then went on to capture Dutch Suriname. The victory though absolute came too late to have any significant impact on the result of the war. News of this disaster shocked not only the French but also the Dutch who had been certain of their domination of the Caribbean. Crinjeens sailed back to the Caribbean in horror only to find the French fleet vaporized and the English back in possession of Suriname. On 31 July the English and Dutch signed the Treaty of Breda, ending the war returning to the status quo.

References

Bibliography

External links
Rickard, J (22 August 2009), Battle of Martinique, 25 June 1667

Battle
Naval battles of the Second Anglo-Dutch War
17th-century conflicts
Naval battles involving England
Naval battles involving France
Conflicts in 1667
Anglo-Dutch Wars
Military history of the Caribbean
1667 in the Caribbean
1667 in the British Empire